

383001–383100 

|-id=067
| 383067 Stoofke ||  || Steven Terlaeken (born 1969), nicknamed Stoofke, created Loop naar de maan ("Run to the moon"), a fund raising event for cancer research organised by Kom op tegen Kanker - Belgium. || 
|}

383101–383200 

|-bgcolor=#f2f2f2
| colspan=4 align=center | 
|}

383201–383300 

|-bgcolor=#f2f2f2
| colspan=4 align=center | 
|}

383301–383400 

|-bgcolor=#f2f2f2
| colspan=4 align=center | 
|}

383401–383500 

|-id=417
| 383417 DAO ||  || The Dominion Astrophysical Observatory (DAO) of the National Research Council of Canada. || 
|-id=492
| 383492 Aubert ||  || Pascal Aubert (born 1966), a French amateur astronomer and observer of solar eclipses all over the world. He has also participated in humanitarian education activities in Madagascar. || 
|}

383501–383600 

|-id=508
| 383508 Vadrot ||  || Laurent Vadrot (born 1975) is secretary-general of the Association Française des Observateurs d´Etoiles Variables. He is heavily involved in the protection of the night sky and in the development of an astronomy station in the Morvan Regional Nature Park (Burgundy). || 
|}

383601–383700 

|-id=622
| 383622 Luigivolta ||  || Luigi Volta (1876–1952), an Italian astronomer and a discoverer of minor planets at the Observatory of Turin during 1928–1934. || 
|}

383701–383800 

|-bgcolor=#f2f2f2
| colspan=4 align=center | 
|}

383801–383900 

|-bgcolor=#f2f2f2
| colspan=4 align=center | 
|}

383901–384000 

|-bgcolor=#f2f2f2
| colspan=4 align=center | 
|}

References 

384001-384000